Pirəmsən (also, Piramsin) is a village and municipality in the Davachi Rayon of Azerbaijan.  It has a population of 908.  The municipality consists of the villages of Pirəmsən and Ərəblər.

References 

Populated places in Shabran District